The 2011 season was Malmö FF's 100th in existence, their 76th season in Allsvenskan and their 11th consecutive season in the league. They competed in Allsvenskan, where they finished in 4th position, Svenska Cupen, where they were knocked out in the quarter-finals, Svenska Supercupen, where they finished as runners-up, the UEFA Champions League, where they were knocked out in the play-off round and finally the UEFA Europa League, where they were knocked out in the group stage. Malmö FF were the reigning champions of Allsvenskan and also returned to European cup play after a five-year absence. Manager Roland Nilsson left the club on 29 May to become the new manager for F.C. Copenhagen, he was replaced by Rikard Norling who officially became the new Malmö FF manager on 3 June.

Summary

Supercupen
The competitive season started on 19 March with Supercupen  at Swedbank Stadion against Helsingborgs IF. Malmö FF had qualified for Supercupen by winning Allsvenskan the previous year while Helsingborg qualified by winning Svenska Cupen. The match ended 2–1 in Helsingborgs favour. This was the first time Malmö FF appeared in the competition after its introduction in 2007.

Svenska Cupen
Malmö FF entered their second cup play of the season on 11 May with round 3 of Svenska Cupen against Superettan club Jönköpings Södra IF at Stadsparksvallen, a match Malmö FF won 4–0. The club progressed another round by beating Halmstads BK 3–0 at Örjans Vall before being knocked out of Svenska Cupen in the quarter-finals on penalties by Kalmar FF at Guldfågeln Arena. The result was the best since the 2002 season when the club reached the semi-finals, despite this the result was disappointing since the club had set out to win the cup.

UEFA Champions League
The club entered European cup play on 13 July when they won their home fixture at Swedbank Stadion against HB Tórshavn with 2–0 in the first tier of the second qualifying round of the UEFA Champions League. The away fixture at Gundadalur ended as a draw with 1–1 as Malmö FF progressed to the next qualifying round. Malmö FF were drawn against Rangers F.C. in the third qualifying round and won the first leg 1–0, away at Ibrox. The home fixture at Swedbank Stadion ended as a draw with 1–1 and the club progressed to the play-off round with an aggregate score of 2–1. The club were drawn against Dinamo Zagreb in the play-off round, the first leg of the tie was played at Stadion Maksimir on 17 August and ended 4–1 in Dinamos favour. The second leg was played at Swedbank Stadion on 23 August, the club won the match 2–0, missing out to advance to the group stage by the away goals rule by one goal. Dinamo Zagreb won with an aggregate score of 4–3 and progressed to the group stage of the UEFA Champions League.

UEFA Europa League
Due to being eliminated in the play-off round of the UEFA Champions League, Malmö FF received a place in the group stage of the UEFA Europa League. The group stage was drawn on 26 August 2011. Malmö FF were seeded in the fourth and lowest seeding group and joined AZ, Metalist Kharkiv and Austria Vienna in Group G. This was the first time the club participated in the competition since its re branding and the first time the club participated in the group stage for an official UEFA competition. Malmö FF played their first match on 15 September away against AZ and lost 4–1. The club then played two home fixtures in a row against Austria Vienna, where they lost 2–1 and against Metalist Kharkiv, where they lost 4–1. Malmö FF then travelled to Ukraine to play Metalist Kharkiv away and lost 3–1. The clubs first and only point in the competition would come against AZ at home, a fixture which ended goalless, however the club needed a win to still have the chance to proceed in the competition and were therefore knocked out. Malmö FF's last match in the competition was the away fixture against Austria Vienna who themselves still had a slight chance to proceed. The match ended 2–0 in Austria Viennas favour, however, this was not enough for Austria Vienna and they found themselves knocked out of the competition along with Malmö FF while Metalist Kharkiv and AZ proceeded to the round of 32.

Allsvenskan
League play started on 3 April with the away fixture against Trelleborgs FF ironically played at Trelleborgs reserve stadium Swedbank Stadion due to their own Vångavallen being in an unplayable state, Malmö FF won the game 4–2. The club went on to win the next three games as well to mark their best league start in 60 years. As the season progressed the club started to drop in the table and found themselves in the middle of the table after 15 rounds, having only won three additional matches after the first four record breaking wins. The beginning of the season was shaped by the spectator scandal that occurred in the home game against rivals Helsingborgs IF when the game was suspended and Helisngborg being awarded a 3–0 win after an incident report. The club also had to appoint a new manager after Roland Nilsson announced his transfer to FC Copenhagen, Rikard Norling succeeded Nilsson on 3 June. The second part of the season started with three draws in a row as the club was struggling to score on the chances that were created. The 23 July derby against Helsingborg away ended in a 2–2 draw. The club only lost one match in the second part of the season, away against Gefle IF 0–2, other than that the club played well and finished the league season with five wins in a row. Malmö FF finished fourth in Allsvenskan and were thus given bronze medals for their performance.

Key events
 25 November 2010: It is confirmed that midfielder Muamet Asanovski will not play for the club for the 2011 season.
 1 December 2010: Midfielder Jeffrey Aubynn signs a new one-year contract, keeping him at the club until the end of the 2011 season.
 8 December 2010: Defender Yago Fernández signs a new one-year contract, keeping him at the club until the end of the 2011 season. Defender Tobias Malm signs a four-year first team contract joining from the youth team. At the same time it is confirmed that defender Joseph Elanga will not play for the club for the 2011 season.
 26 January 2011: Midfielder Rick Kruys is loaned to FC Volendam until May 2011.
 25 March 2011: Goalkeeper Dejan Garača is loaned to IF Limhamn Bunkeflo for the entire season. The agreement between the clubs allows for the player to return to Malmö FF on a 24-hour basis if necessary.
 8 April 2011: Midfielder Jiloan Hamad signs a new two-year contract, keeping him at the club until the end of the 2013 season.
 4 May 2011: Midfielder Amin Nazari signs a two and a half year first team contract joining from the youth team.
 24 May 2011: Defender Jasmin Sudić signs a new 3-year contract, keeping him at the club until the end of the 2014 season.Defender Filip Stenström is loaned to IF Limhamn Bunkeflo for the entire season. The agreement between the clubs allows for the player to return to Malmö FF on a 24-hour basis if necessary.
 25 May 2011: The club presents Rikard Norling as the new head coach after it has become clear that current manager Roland Nilsson is leaving the club to take over FC Copenhagen.
 17 June 2011: Midfielder Guillermo Molins leaves the club for Belgian club Anderlecht.
 22 June 2011: Defender Ulrich Vinzents signs a new one-year contract, keeping him at the club until the end of the 2012 season.
 19 July 2011: Midfielder Rick Kruys is loaned to FC Volendam for the rest of the season.
 14 August 2011: Defender Miiko Albornoz joins the club on a four-year contract transferring from IF Brommapojkarna.
 30 August 2011: Striker Mathias Ranégie joins the club on a three-year contract transferring from BK Häcken.
 29 September 2011: Defender Ricardinho signs a new three-year contract, keeping him at the club until the end of the 2014 season.

Players

Squad

Players in/out

In

Out

Squad stats

|}

Disciplinary record

Club

Coaching staff

Other information

Competitions

Overall

Allsvenskan

League table

Results summary

Results by round
Note: Since some matches were postponed, the "position" field has been corrected in hindsight.

Matches
Kickoff times are in CEST.

Svenska Cupen

Kickoff times are in CEST.

Svenska Supercupen

Kickoff times are in CET.

UEFA Champions League

Qualifying phase and play-off round

Second qualifying round

Third qualifying round

Play-off round

UEFA Europa League

Group stage

Kickoff times are in CET.

Non competitive

Pre-season

Copa del Sol

Friendlies

Mid-season

Post league-season

Abandoned matches

Malmö FF vs. Helsingborg
1. The Allsvenskan match between Malmö FF and Helsingborg, played at Swedbank Stadion on 24 May, was suspended in the 30th match minute after two spectator related incidents. After Rachid Bouaouzan had opened up the score for Helsingborg a spectator from Malmö FF's standing section threw a firecracker popularly called "bangers" onto the pitch and close to Helsingborg keeper Pär Hansson. The result of the "banger" was that Hansson displayed visually and verbally the fact that he had been hurt and was suffering some kind of ringing in his right ear. Simultaneously a supporter from the same section jumped over the gates restricting access to the pitch and started walking towards Hansson. The man managed to give Hansson a push before being tackled to the ground by Helsingborg player Peter Larsson. The referee Stefan Johannesson ordered all players and club staff of the pitch and adjoining areas as the police carried the attacker off the pitch and into custody. After a twenty-minute wait the speaker announced that the referee had taken the decision to abandon the match and evacuate the spectators from the ground. On 17 June 2011 the Swedish Football Association reached a decision on the outcome of the game. Helsingborg were awarded the game 3–0 although being fined 25 000 SEK, Malmö FF were fined 150 000 SEK as well as the introduction of a net in front of the standing section at Swedbank Stadion. On 18 October 2011, the man who invaded the pitch was sentenced to 120 day-fines, not only for invading the pitch but also for throwing the firecracker. Both Malmö FF and Canal + are planning to sue the man for causing financial damages.

Malmö FF vs. Djurgården
2. The Allsvenskan match between Malmö FF and Djurgården, played at Swedbank Stadion on 30 July, was suspended in the 11th match minute after a spectator related incident. Dardan Rexhepi scored the first goal of the match in the 5th match minute to open up the score for the home side. In the 7th minute, Djurgården forward Daniel Sjölund was given a yellow-card and six fireworks were launched. According to Canal+, one of the fireworks was close to hitting a photographer. There were different opinions as to where the fireworks came from: Canal+ believed that the fireworks came from the section above the Djurgården terrace while the police believed that all the fireworks came from within the Djurgården section. On 5 September, the Swedish FA made the decision that the game will be replayed from kick-off on 15 October as there was a lack of evidence regarding where the fireworks came from. Due to the rematch date, the Malmö–Syrianska game date was moved to 17 October, as all teams should have at least two rest-days between each game. As a result, Malmö FF played three straight home games in just five days. Malmö FF appealed to change the outcome of the decision to a 3–0 win in Malmö FF's favour since they believed there was sufficient amount of evidence to confirm that the fireworks came from Djurgården supporters. However, on 7 October 2011, the appeal was declined, and the rematch was set to be kicked off on 15 October at 11 am. However, Malmö FF wanted to start the game at 12 pm. The rematch was won by Malmö 1–0.

Footnotes

Malmö FF seasons
Malmo FF